Sphingobacterium changzhouense is a Gram-negative, non-spore-forming and rod-shaped bacterium from the genus of Sphingobacterium which has been isolated from soil from a rice field in Jiangsu in China.

References

External links
Type strain of Sphingobacterium changzhouense at BacDive -  the Bacterial Diversity Metadatabase

Sphingobacteriia
Bacteria described in 2013